Click Music Philippines is a Filipino music website that attempts to increase the play of Original Pilipino Music and provide more compensation to Filipino composers.

Launched in 2010, Click Music is a joint venture between the Filipino Composers Development Cooperative and the Kapisanan ng mga Broadkaster ng Pilipinas (KBP). Its download site is clickmusic.com.ph. KBP Chairman Jun Nicdao said that Click Music alliance will generate more and better music content for airing by KBP member stations.

Click Music is the first project in the Philippines that brings composers and radio networks and maintains a tighter focus on copyright ownership in the value chain during the production and distribution of creative content..

The KBP Pop Music Festival 

In 2010, Click Music sponsored the first  KBP Pop Music Festival, aiming to generate new song content. This contest is unique from other songwriting contests because the competition will be done in the airwaves. The top 500 entries that make it to the semi-finals received be provided mandatory radio airplay.

See also 
Kapisanan ng mga Brodkaster ng Pilipinas

References

Philippine music websites